The Men's 100 metre backstroke competition of the swimming events at the 2015 World Aquatics Championships was held on 3 August with the heats and the semifinals and 4 August with the final.

Records
Prior to the competition, the existing world and championship records were as follows.

Results

Heats
The heats were held on 3 August at 09:49.

Semifinals
The semifinals were held on 3 August at 17:48.

Semifinal 1

Semifinal 2

Final

The final was held on 4 August at 18:36.

References

Men's 100 metre backstroke